Eggolsheim is a municipality in the district of Forchheim in Bavaria in Germany.

Subdivisions 

Eggolsheim has twelve other villages within its municipal area:

References

 
Forchheim (district)